John Owen Pettibone (October 22, 1787 – August 19, 1876) was an American politician.

He was born in Simsbury, Connecticut.  He graduated from Yale College in 1805 and was the last surviving member of the Class of 1805.

He had spent his life in Simsbury, highly respected and honored. He had repeatedly been a member of both houses of the Connecticut State Legislature.  He died at Simsbury, Aug. 19, 1876, at the age of 89.

External links

1787 births
1876 deaths
People from Simsbury, Connecticut
Yale College alumni
Connecticut state senators
Members of the Connecticut House of Representatives
19th-century American politicians